Mujaddara ( mujadarah, with alternative spellings in English majadra, mejadra, moujadara, mudardara, and megadarra) consists of cooked lentils together with groats, generally rice, and garnished with sautéed onions. It is especially popular in the Levant.

Name and origin
Mujaddara is the Arabic word for "pockmarked"; the lentils among the rice resemble pockmarks. The first recorded recipe for mujaddara appears in Kitab al-Tabikh, a cookbook compiled in 1226 by al-Baghdadi in Iraq. Containing rice, lentils, and meat, it was served this way during celebrations. Without meat, it was a medieval Arab dish commonly consumed by the poor, reputed to be a derivative of the "mess of pottage" Jacob used to buy Esau's birthright. Because of its importance in the diet, a saying in the Eastern Arab world is, "A hungry man would be willing to sell his soul for a dish of mujaddara."

Variations
Cooked lentils are popular all over the Middle East and form the basis of many dishes. Mujaddara is a popular dish throughout the Arab world, and is generally made using brown or green lentils and rice, that can be seasoned with cumin, coriander, or mint. It is topped with fried onions and is generally served with yogurt, among other vegetables and side dishes, either hot or cold.

The dish is made with brown lentils and rice. In Lebanon, the word mjaddara refers to the puréed version of the dish, rather than the version with whole grains and lentils. Mjaddara usually has the consistency of rice pudding whereas in the Lebanese variant known as mudardara, the rice and lentils remain relatively intact and distinct. Both mujaddara and mudardara are topped with caramelized onions and usually served with yogurt or a salad.

Arab Christians traditionally eat mujaddara during Lent. 

The dish is also popular among Israelis of Sephardic and Jewish communities of Middle Eastern origin, in particular those of Syrian and Egyptian backgrounds; it is generally made with rice rather than wheat.

It is sometimes nicknamed "Esau's favourite". Jews traditionally ate it twice a week: hot on Thursday evening, and cold on Sunday. The dish is also popular among Druze in the Levant.

Palestinians replace the rice with bulgur; the dish is called m'jaddaret-burghul to distinguish it from the m'jaddara which is served with rice. Pronounced as m'jaddara, the dish is served multiple times a month for family, cooked with olive oil and onion strips, and served alongside local plain sheep's-milk yogurt (laban n'aj) made in Nablus, with green salad.

Similar dishes
In Egyptian cuisine, lentils, rice, macaroni, and tomato sauce cooked together are known as kushari. In Indian cuisines, lentils cooked together with rice are known as khichdi (see also kedgeree). In Iranian cuisine, a similar dish composed of rice and lentils is called addas polo.

In Cypriot cuisine, the dish called fakes moutzentra is very similar to mujaddara, as it consists of lentils and rice. In Greek, fakes means lentils.

References

Notation
Roden, Claudia, A New Book of Middle Eastern Food: London 1986

External links
Wikibooks recipe (Palestine)
Wikibooks recipe (Lebanon)
Jordanian Mujaddara Recipe 
Kitchen of Palestine: Mjaddara Recipe
Variation using quinoa instead of rice

Arabic words and phrases
Arab cuisine
Jordanian cuisine
Rice dishes
Lebanese cuisine
Legume dishes
Lentil dishes
Levantine cuisine
Palestinian cuisine
Syrian cuisine
Iraqi cuisine
Israeli cuisine
National dishes
Bulgur dishes